Manly is not an unincorporated community in Moore County, in the U.S. state of North Carolina.

History
A post office called Manly was established in 1881, and remained in operation until 1959. The community was named for Charles Manly, 31st Governor of North Carolina.

See also

References

External links

Unincorporated communities in Moore County, North Carolina
Unincorporated communities in North Carolina